The 1905 Auburn Tigers football team represented Alabama Polytechnic Institute (now known Auburn University) in the 1905 Southern Intercollegiate Athletic Association football season. The team was led by head coach Mike Donahue, in his second year, and played their home games at both the Drill Field in Auburn and West End Park in Birmingham, Alabama. They finished the season with a record of two wins and four losses (2–4 overall, 2–3 in the SIAA).

Schedule

References

Auburn
Auburn Tigers football seasons
Auburn Tigers football